The barred queenfish (Scomberoides tala), also known as deep queenfish or deep leatherjacket, is a species of ray-finned fish in the family Carangidae, the jacks and related fishes. It is found in the eastern Indian Ocean and western Pacific Ocean.

References

Fish described in 1832
Scomberoides
Taxa named by Georges Cuvier